Choi Cheon-sik (born 29 July 1965) is a South Korean volleyball player. He competed at the 1988 Summer Olympics and the 1996 Summer Olympics.

References

1965 births
Living people
South Korean men's volleyball players
Olympic volleyball players of South Korea
Volleyball players at the 1988 Summer Olympics
Volleyball players at the 1996 Summer Olympics
Place of birth missing (living people)
Asian Games medalists in volleyball
Asian Games silver medalists for South Korea
Volleyball players at the 1986 Asian Games
Medalists at the 1986 Asian Games
20th-century South Korean people
21st-century South Korean people